PSK Sakhalin (Russian: ПСК «Сахалин»), formerly known as HK Sakhalin and Sakhalin Sea Lions, is an ice hockey team based in Yuzhno-Sakhalinsk, Sakhalin Oblast, Russia. Sakhalin joined the Asia League Ice Hockey (ALIH) in 2014 and played in the competition until 2022, when the ALIH voted to remove the team in protest of the Russian invasion of Ukraine.

Honours
Asia League Ice Hockey:
Regular season winners (2): 2017–18, 2019–20
Championship winners (2): 2018–19, 2019–20

References

External links
Official website 

Asia League Ice Hockey teams
Ice hockey clubs established in 2013
Sport in Yuzhno-Sakhalinsk
2013 establishments in Russia